The Curious Quests of Brigadier Ffellowes is a collection of fantasy short stories by American writer Sterling E. Lanier.  The stories take the form of tall tales told in a bar or club, similar to the Jorkens stories of Lord Dunsany.  It was first published in 1986 by Donald M. Grant, Publisher, Inc. in an edition of 1,200 copies, all of which were signed by the author and artist.  The last story is original to this collection.  The other stories first appeared in the magazine Fantasy and Science Fiction.

Contents
 "The Curious Quests of Brigadier Ffellowes" (Ned Dameron)
 "Introduction" (Donald M. Grant)
 "Fore/Thought/Word"
 "Ghost of a Crown" (1976)
 "And the Voice of the Turtle ..." (1972)
 "A Father's Tale" (1974)
 "Commander in the Mist" (1982)
 "Thinking of the Unthinkable" (1973)
 "The Brigadier in Check — and Mate"

Sources

1986 short story collections
Fantasy short story collections
Donald M. Grant, Publisher books